The 2017–18 GFA League First Division is the 49th season of top-tier football in Gambia. The season began on 18 November 2017 and ended on 24 May 2018.

Standings
Final table.

See also
2018 Gambian Cup

References

GFA League First Division seasons
Premier League
Premier League
Gambia